Yaser Karami (born April 22, 1992) is an Iranian football forward who plays for Moghavemat Tehran in Iran Football's 2nd Division.

Club career
He played his first match for Saba Qom in 2010–11 season.

Club career statistics

 Assist Goals

References

External links
 Yaser Karami at Persian League
 

Iranian footballers
Living people
Saba players
1992 births
Association football forwards